The 1966 British League season was the 32nd season of the top tier of speedway in the United Kingdom and the second season known as the British League. Halifax Dukes won the league and then secured the league and cup double.

Summary
The League expanded to 19, with a new team, the King's Lynn Stars. Halifax Dukes won the league after 36 games and finished three points clear of Coventry Bees. The Halifax team success was due to the consistency of their riders, in particular Eric Boocock, Eric Boothroyd, Dave Younghusband and Tommy Roper who all scored heavily throughout the season. Halifax also completed the double winning the British League Knockout Cup. In they final they easily beat Wimbledon Dons.

The four times world champion Barry Briggs topped the averages for Swindon Robins during the same season in which he sealed his fourth world title. The dangers of speedway were highlighted once again however when Welshman Ivor Hughes was killed during the league match riding for Cradley Heath Heathens against Sheffield Tigers on 20 August.

Final table

M = Matches; W = Wins; D = Draws; L = Losses; Pts = Total Points

Knockout Cup
Halifax Dukes won the cup and therefore secured the league and cup double.

Final leading average

Riders & final averages
Belle Vue

 9.55
 7.79
 7.54
 5.86
 5.35
 5.01
 4.27
 0.36

Coventry

 10.54
 9.29
 9.22
 8.81
 5.52
 4.31
 3.06
 2.74
 2.12

Cradley Heath

 7.88
 6.51
 6.32 
 6.10
 5.65
 (Kid Brodie) 5.48
 3.64
 3.58
 2.40
 2.33
 2.00

Edinburgh

 8.17 
 7.65
 7.42 
 5.83
 5.27
 5.20
 4.81
 4.55

Exeter

 9.11
 8.23
 7.32
 6.61
 6.23
 5.37
 4.80
 4.77
 2.40

Glasgow

 9.27
 7.47 
 7.06
 6.75
 6.35
 5.30
 4.95
 3.54

Hackney

 10.00
 8.63
 6.81
 5.40
 5.25
 4.58
 3.44
 2.86
 2.00

Halifax

 10.46
 9.29
 8.82
 7.54
 6.00
 5.38
 4.98
 4.00
 2.33

King's Lynn

 9.41
 9.18
 6.20
 4.90
 4.73
 3.75
 3.55
 2.61
 2.61
 2.17

Long Eaton

 9.64
 8.63
 7.68
 6.72
 5.14
 4.97
 4.96
 4.44
 4.12
 4.00

Newcastle

 9.82 
 8.05
 7.74 
 6.37
 6.11
 5.82
 4.57
 5.20

Newport

 10.44
 7.23 
 6.03
 5.54
 5.43
 5.34
 4.75
 3.68

Oxford

 9.53 
 8.14
 5.96
 5.86
 5.04
 4.10
 3.93
 1.00

Poole

 9.12 
 8.83 
 8.22
 6.18
 5.76
 5.48
 5.43
 4.20

Sheffield

 8.12 
 7.81
 7.27 
 7.16
 6.86
 5.93
 5.70
 5.68
 4.82

Swindon

 11.12 
 9.60
 9.01
 5.88
 5.67
 5.29
 4.48
 2.48

West Ham

 9.89
 9.67
 9.42
 6.14
 5.89
 4.30
 3.53
 3.00
 2.32

Wimbledon

 10.40
 9.39
 8.68
 6.95
 3.97
 3.23
 3.20
 2.88

Wolverhampton

 8.67
 7.77
 6.57
 5.47
 5.46
 5.46
 5.31
 5.14

See also
List of United Kingdom Speedway League Champions
Knockout Cup (speedway)

References

British League
1966 in British motorsport
1966 in speedway